TY Coronae Australis (abbreviated as TY CrA), is a young star system around 3 million years old in the constellation Corona Australis. It is composed of a blue-white B-class star around triple the Sun's mass and a cooler smaller companion around half its mass (or 1.6 times that of the Sun). The system is an eclipsing binary with a period of 2.8 days.

References

Corona Australis
Herbig Ae/Be stars
Eclipsing binaries
Durchmusterung objects
Coronae Australis, TY